Kjell Storelid (born 24 October 1970) is a former speed skater from Norway. Storelid's best achievement on the ice was two silver medals on 5,000 m and 10,000 m at the Winter Olympics 1994 in Lillehammer - behind Johann Olav Koss. In the two next Olympic games Storelid came 5th and 8th on 10,000 m. Even though Storelid was a typical long distance racer, he has a 6th place in the World Championships and a 5th place from the European Championships. He has won one Norwegian championship - 5,000 m in 2000.

Personal records
500 m - 38.86
1,500 m - 1:52.19
5,000 m - 6:30.05
10,000 m - 13:27.24

External links
Kjell Storelid at SkateResults.com

1970 births
Living people
Norwegian male speed skaters
Olympic speed skaters of Norway
Olympic silver medalists for Norway
Speed skaters at the 1994 Winter Olympics
Speed skaters at the 1998 Winter Olympics
Speed skaters at the 2002 Winter Olympics
Olympic medalists in speed skating
Medalists at the 1994 Winter Olympics